Poetry of Fire is the third album by Iceburn, released in 1995 through Revelation Records.

Track listing

Personnel 
Iceburn
Gentry Densley – guitar
James Holder – guitar
Greg Nielsen – tenor saxophone
Joseph Chad Smith – drums
Cache Tolman – bass guitar
Production and additional personnel
Rick Egan – photography
Dean Harper – recording on "Discolor"
Iceburn – production
Tony Korologos – recording on "Poem of Fire", "Stones" and "Blues"
Spanky – recording on "Poem of Fire (live)"

References

External links 
 

1995 albums
Iceburn albums
Revelation Records albums